

2011–12 Top 3 Standings

Events summary

Standings

References

- Overall Women, 2012-13 Biathlon World Cup